Bagrichthys majusculus is one of seven species of bagrid catfish in the genus Bagrichthys. It is endemic to Thailand.

References 
 

Bagridae
Endemic fauna of Thailand
Fish of Thailand
Fish described in 2002